Saint-Vincent-Lespinasse is a commune in the Tarn-et-Garonne department in the Occitanie region in southern France.

Geography
The Barguelonne forms part of the commune's northern border.

See also
Communes of the Tarn-et-Garonne department

References

Communes of Tarn-et-Garonne